The Scottish Union of Dock Labourers was a Glasgow-based trade union for waterfront workers. It was formed during the seamen's and dockers' strikes of June–July 1911.  Locally, it replaced the National Union of Dock Labourers, which had been formed in Glasgow in 1889 but later became unpopular in that port, finally closing its local branch in February 1910. The president of the SUDL throughout its lifetime was Joe Houghton. The union joined the Transport & General Workers' Union in 1922, but many of its members left in 1932 to form the Scottish Transport and General Workers' Union (Docks).

See also

 Transport and General Workers' Union
 TGWU amalgamations

Further reading
 William Kenefick, Rebellious and Contrary: The Glasgow Dockers, 1853-1932 (Scottish Historical Review Monograph No. 10., East Linton, Tuckwell Press, 2000

Economic history of Scotland
Defunct trade unions of Scotland
Organisations based in Glasgow
Port workers' trade unions
Water transport in the United Kingdom
Water transport in Scotland
1911 establishments in Scotland
Transport and General Workers' Union amalgamations
Trade unions established in 1911
Trade unions disestablished in 1922